James Joy Mohan Nichols Roy (or J.J.M. Nichols Roy; 12 June 1884 – 1 November 1959) was a Christian minister and politician from what is now the state of Meghalaya, India.
Before the independence of India he agitated for autonomy of the tribal peoples of northeast India.
After independence this was enshrined in the Sixth Schedule  of the Constitution of India through his efforts.

Early years

James Joy Mohan Nichols Roy was born on 12 June 1884 at Mawsyiarwait, Shella confederacy, now in the East Khasi Hills district of Meghalaya, India.
His father was U Khan Than Roy, a manual day laborer from Khapmaw in what was then Shillong State.
His great uncle was U Tirot Singh of Nongkhlaw Syiemship.
He attended Lba High School, but his education was disrupted in 1897 by a great earthquake.
His house was not badly damaged, but his parents chose to move to Jasir for greater safety.

Nichols Roy adopted the Christian faith in 1898, a year after the earthquake.
He joined the Church of God, a Christian denomination that originated in the United States, and later became a leading member.
Nichols Roy was admitted to Shillong government High School in 1899.
He went to university in Kolkata, and earned a B.A. in 1904.

Rev. Nichols Roy founded the United Fruit Company in 1918, a joint stock cooperative for tribal people.
Activities included planting orange trees, selling fruit juice, processing orange squash, operating a motor transport company and an indigenous bank, and importing essential goods from the plains to the hill people.

Pre-independence politics

In 1921 Nichols Roy was appointed to the Assam Governor's Council as the first representative of tribal people.
As a member of the Governor's Council he initiated acts against consuming opium, smoking tobacco and drinking alcoholic and other intoxicating drinks.
He was one of the founders of the  Assam Christian Council (today NEICC) in 1937.

Nichols Roy was elected to the Assam Legislative Assembly in 1937.
He was a minister in the Assam coalition cabinets of 1 April 1937 – 4 February 1938 and 5 February 1938 – 18 September 1938.
Despite serving under Muhammed Saadulah in these two ministries, Nichols Roy was opposed to the efforts by the Muslim League to make Assam part of Pakistan.
He was more naturally aligned with the Congress Party.
He was again a minister in the Congress cabinet of 11 February 1946 – 14 August 1947.

When the political structure of independent India was being discussed, the British were inclined to keep the tribal people of the Excluded and Partially Excluded areas separate from the plainspeople, but Indians such as Rohini Kumar Chaudhuri wanted them to be part of a unified state of Assam so they could be assimilated into the plains culture.
The leaders of the hill people disagreed, and wanted to retain separation from the non-tribal people.
Nichols Roy, leader of the Khasi people, was the most prominent member of the educated elite, pushing for autonomy of the hill districts of Assam at time of independence.

Nichols Roy influenced Jawaharlal Nehru to create the Khasi Jaintia National Federation State Conference (KJFSC), a regional party in Meghalaya's Khasi-Jaintia hills, which aimed for autonomous government among tribal people throughout northeast India.
Nichols Roy's Khasi National Conference communicated with similar organizations such as the Garo National Conference, Mizo Union and Naga National Council.
In response, the constitutional plan defined District Councils to look after tribal affairs in the hill districts, to which the chiefs would be subordinate.

Constituent Assembly
Nichols Roy was elected as a Congress Party member for Assam in the Constituent Assembly, where he stood up for tribal rights and autonomy.
Nichols Roy made important contributions to the Constituent Assembly, and was one of a handful of Hill Tribe leaders to become national figures.
He was largely responsible for the Sixth Schedule of the Constitution of India.
This schedule provides for tribal areas in Assam, Meghalaya, Tripura and Mizoram to be administered as autonomous districts or regions.
Nichols Roy and Gopinath Bordoloi asserted that the schedule would prevent alienation, promote development and protect tribal populations from exploitation.
Laws passed by the special governments in the schedule areas would usually require the governor's assent, so the Union would remain in control.

K.M. Munshi proposed that the constitution should state, "Any conversion from one religion to another of any person brought about by fraud, coercion or undue influence or of a minor under the age of 18 shall not be recognised by law.
Speaking against this proposal,  Nichols Roy said,

Post-independence

Nichols Roy was a member of the Bardoloi government of Assam after independence, but became alienated from the Congress party due to its dominance by middle class Assamese.
He turned to supporting the Hill State Movement, with its goal of forming a separate state of Khasi, Jaintia and Garo peoples.
Nichols Roy died on 1 November 1959.
The Government of India issued a 500 Paise commemorative stamp in his honor on 12 June 2009.

Publications

See also
Hill tribes of Northeast India

Notes

Sources

 

1884 births
1959 deaths
Indian National Congress politicians from Meghalaya